An annular solar eclipse occurred on November 11, 1863, during spring.  A solar eclipse occurs when the Moon passes between Earth and the Sun, thereby totally or partly obscuring the image of the Sun for a viewer on Earth. An annular solar eclipse occurs when the Moon's apparent diameter is smaller than the Sun's, blocking most of the Sun's light and causing the Sun to look like an annulus (ring). An annular eclipse appears as a partial eclipse over a region of the Earth thousands of kilometres wide.

Parts of the areas near the Indian Ocean occurred where the solar eclipse occurred on November 21, 1862.  It was part of the solar saros 121

Description
The eclipse took place in Africa including Namacqualand (then also South-West Africa, now Namibia), Bechuanaland (now Botswana) South Africa (which included the British colonies and the Boer states at the time), Basutoland (parts now Lesotho), Zululand (now part of KwaZulu-Natal, South Africa) and portions of Swaziland.  The rest took place in the South Atlantic up to hundreds of kilometers (or miles) offshore from South America except for Tierra del Fuego which was included and included the islands, the Indian Ocean, all of Antarctica which many areas had a 24-hour daylight that time, the southernmost areas of Australia along with Tasmania and the southernmost parts of the Pacific Ocean.

As the moon moved towards the left on Earth in Africa, at the peninsular portion, it was seen as it was moved towards the bottom right, then right then top as the axis spun at around the 71st parallel south.

The eclipse started at sunrise close to South America and finished at sunset in Australia, 70% at the Antarctic shores at the Indian Ocean.

It showed up to 30% obscuration in the area of Cape Town and Cape Agulhas up to 99% inside the maximum width of band. The greatest eclipse was in the middle of Antarctica east of the Prime Meridian at 75.4 S, 15.1 E at 8:09 UTC (9:09 AM local time) and lasted for 22 seconds, the maximum width of band was only 42 km (26 miles), the view around it was partly dark even inside the clouds.

The subsolar marking was east of Madagascar and close to the Mascarene Islands.

See also 
 List of solar eclipses in the 19th century

References

External links 
 Google interactive maps
 Solar eclipse data

1863 11 11
Solar eclipse of 11 11
1863 11 11
November 1863 events